Christmas Inheritance is a 2017 Canadian Christmas comedy-drama film directed by Ernie Barbarash and written by Dinah Eng. The film stars Eliza Taylor, Jake Lacy and Andie MacDowell. The film was released on Netflix on December 15, 2017. The film features Taylor as a spoiled New York City heiress sent to a small New England town with limited resources to test if she's ready to take over her father's company. When circumstances strand her, her experiences with the townspeople gives her a new perspective on life and her privilege, while also leading to romance with the local inn manager.

Plot
Manhattan business executive Jim Langford is ready to retire but is concerned that his daughter Ellen is too spoiled, immature and thus, not ready to inherit his position as CEO. Jim and his former business partner Zeke have a Christmas tradition of exchanging letters in-person in Snow Falls, their New England hometown where they started their business. As a test, Ellen is sent to Snow Falls in her father's stead to hand deliver a new letter to "Uncle Zeke." Hoping she can learn something from the small town lifestyle of Snow Falls and wanting her to rely on herself rather than the family wealth and influential name, Jim takes Ellen's credit cards, gives her $100 in cash, and tells her to travel incognito.

In Snow Falls, Ellen befriends Jake, manager of the Snow Falls Guest House inn. Learning Zeke has just left for his cabin, Ellen books a room at the inn to wait for him. She dines with Jake at a local diner managed by his Aunt Debbie. With no word from Zeke the next day, Ellen's fiancé Gray says she should leave the letter and come home. Ellen refuses, wanting to fulfill her father's request. Not having money to stay another night, she works as a housekeeper for Jake. When she fails, Jake asks what her job is and she lies that she is a baker. Ellen is then sent to work in the diner's kitchen with Debbie, who recognizes her as Langford's daughter. After Ellen explains her reasons for traveling incognito, Debbie promises to keep her secret and teaches her how to bake.

A snowstorm causes road closures and parts of Snow Falls to lose power. Jake offers shelter for many at the inn. Influenced by Jake, Ellen offers shelter to Baxter, a homeless man she dismissed earlier, then offers her bed to a woman with two children. While helping clean the inn, Ellen discovers Jake is an artist. Jake explains he lived in New York and was engaged to a stockbroker who then left him for a client, after which he returned to Snow Falls. "Silent Night" was playing when she broke up with him, and Jake is still triggered by the song. Ellen explains she became shallow and self-focused as a teenager following the death of her mother, deciding things didn't matter beyond enjoyment. She remarks Jake is teaching her other things are important. They nearly kiss but Ellen stops. Jake later apologizes, saying it has been a long time since he met someone like Ellen whom he felt he could trust.

To help a charity auction Jake is running, the next day Ellen visits businesses around town and convinces them all to donate items. Gray arrives in Snow Falls, demanding Ellen leave with him so they can take their Christmas vacation. When Ellen discusses her experiences in town, Gray says she is playacting and does not belong here. Still unable to find Zeke, Ellen reads the letters between him and Jim, touched by their friendship and lives. Running into Jake at a bar, Gray reveals Ellen's identity. Jake feels betrayed.

The next day, Gray wants to leave. Giving in, Ellen asks Jake to give the letter to Zeke for her. He refuses and reveals he knows her identity, remarking she is another dishonest person from New York. After Ellen leaves, Jake listens to "Silent Night." On the drive back to NYC, Ellen realizes she left her father's most recent letter at the inn and wants to go back. Gray refuses, dismissing the letters and her father's Christmas tradition as stupid. He then suggests Jake will send the letter back since the man knows how important her family is. Realizing Gray is the one who told Jake her identity, Ellen angrily scolds him, insisting traveling incognito was necessary for her to learn from the people of Snow Falls. When Gray says nothing can be learned from "hicks," Ellen gives back her engagement ring and returns to Snow Falls via bus.

At the community Christmas Eve celebration, Ellen finds Jake. She apologizes, explaining she has left Gray and has a better perspective on life now thanks to Jake and the people of Snow Falls. Dressed as Santa, Zeke reads Jim's important letter to the crowd. The letter explains Jim is sending his daughter incognito to learn the value of tradition, friendship, and love, as she will now be the new CEO. Zeke was aware of the plan and deliberately kept his distance from Ellen so she could see the town for herself without his or Jim's influence. Jim reveals he is at the party as well, to congratulate Ellen on her new position and perspective.

Jim reunites with Debbie, his high school girlfriend. Debbie then sings "Silent Night" as Jake asks Ellen to dance.

Cast

Production
The film began shooting in North Bay, Ontario on March 24, 2017 and wrapped principal production there on April 8, 2017.

Toronto based makeup artist Alessondra Bastianoni worked as key makeup artist with fellow makeup artist Kim Bean as her first assistant.

Reception
On review aggregator website Rotten Tomatoes, the film holds an approval rating of 50% based on 6 reviews, and an average rating of 6.2/10.

See also
 List of Christmas films

References

External links
 
 Let's Go To The Movies Review

2017 films
2010s Christmas films
English-language Canadian films
Canadian Christmas films
English-language Netflix original films
Christmas television films
Films directed by Ernie Barbarash
2010s English-language films
2010s Canadian films
Canadian comedy-drama films